John James Stewart Farmer (born 5 August 1934) is an English former first-class cricketer.

Farmer was born at Leatherhead in August 1934. He was educated at Eton College, before going up to Christ Church, Oxford. While studying at Oxford, he made two appearances in first-class cricket for Oxford University against Gloucestershire and Lancashire at Oxford in 1958, scoring 10 runs.

References

External links

1934 births
Living people
People from Leatherhead
People educated at Eton College
Alumni of Christ Church, Oxford
English cricketers
Oxford University cricketers